Carl Mountain is a mountain located in the Catskill Mountains of New York east-northeast of Phoenicia. Tremper Mountain is located southwest, and Mount Tobias is located southeast of Carl Mountain.

References

Mountains of Ulster County, New York
Mountains of New York (state)